John the Younger or John of Denmark (25 March 1545 – 9 October 1622) was the Duke of Schleswig-Holstein-Sonderburg.

Biography

John was born on 25 March 1545 in Haderslev in the Duchy of Schleswig as the fourth child and third son of King Christian III of Denmark and Norway and his wife, Dorothea of Saxe-Lauenburg. When Christian III died in 1559, he left three sons. Where the eldest, Frederick II, had long ago been appointed successor to the thrones of Denmark and Norway, all three brothers were in principle equally entitled to the father's share of the duchies of Schleswig and Holstein. To avoid unfortunate divisions of the royal part of the duchies, attempts were made to find suitable positions for the younger brothers elsewhere. The middle brother, Magnus, consequently, gave up his right of inheritance when Frederick II had him placed as prince-bishop of Ösel-Wiek in Livonia. 

However, the plan to secure John the post of the prince-archbishop's successor in the Archdiocese of Bremen failed due to strong competition from North German princes. Other options abroad were thwarted because Denmark needed the support of the North German princes against Sweden in the Nordic Seven Years' War, and the king could not act as a competitor in acquiring lucrative offices and benefices for his brother. Consequently, Frederick had to agree to share his father's share of the duchies with his youngest brother, and allotted him a portion of the duchies with Sonderburg (today Danish Sønderborg) as his ducal seat.

He acted actively in the Danish government, for example supporting his sister-in-law, the Queen, when his nephew, Christian IV of Denmark, was underage. There were plans for him to marry the Dowager Queen in 1588 or 1589, repudiating his second, young wife. John died  in Glücksburg.

Family and children
John married twice. Firstly, he married in Kolding on August 19, 1568 Elisabeth of Brunswick-Grubenhagen (20 March 1550 Salzderhelden – 11 February 1586 Østerholm), daughter of Ernest III, Duke of Brunswick-Grubenhagen and Princess Margarethe of Pommerania-Wolgast (1518–1569). They had the following children:
 Dorothea of Schleswig-Holstein-Sonderburg (9 October 1569 Kolding– 5 July 1593 Legnica), married on 23 November 1589 to Frederick IV, Duke of Legnica.
 Christian, Duke of Schleswig-Holstein-Sonderburg-Ærø (24 October 1570 – 4 June 1633)
 Ernest of Schleswig-Holstein-Sonderburg (17 January 1572 – 26 October 1596)
 Alexander, Duke of Schleswig-Holstein-Sonderburg (20 January 1573 – 13 May 1627)
 August of Schleswig-Holstein-Sonderburg (26 July 1574 – 26 October 1596)
 Marie of Schleswig-Holstein-Sonderburg, Abbess of Itzehoe (22 August 1575 – 6 December 1640)
 John Adolph, Duke of Schleswig-Holstein-Sønderburg-Norburg (17 September 1576 – 21 February 1624)
 Anna of Schleswig-Holstein-Sonderburg (7 October 1577 – 30 January 1616), married on 31 May 1601 to Bogislaw XIII, Duke of Pomerania.
 Sophia of Schleswig-Holstein-Sonderburg (30 May 1579 – 3 June 1658, in Treptow an der Rega, her dower), married on 8 March 1607 to Philip II, Duke of Pomerania-Stettin
 Elisabeth of Schleswig-Holstein-Sonderburg (24 September 1580 – 21 December 1653), married on 19 February 1615 to Bogislaw XIV, Duke of Pomerania (son of her sister Anna's husband, Bogilaw XIII, Duke of Pomerania).
 Frederick, Duke of Schleswig-Holstein-Sonderburg-Norburg (26 October 1581 – 22 July 1658), married on 1 August 1627 to Juliana of Saxe-Lauenburg, daughter of Francis II, Duke of Saxe-Lauenburg.
 Margaret of Schleswig-Holstein-Sonderburg (24 February 1583 – 20 April 1658), married on 27 August 1603 to John VII, Count of Nassau-Siegen.
 Philip, Duke of Schleswig-Holstein-Sonderburg-Glücksburg (15 March 1584 – 27 September 1663)
 Albrecht of Schleswig-Holstein-Sonderburg (16 April 1585 – 30 April 1613)

Secondly, he married on 14 February 1588 Princess Agnes Hedwig of Anhalt (12 March 1573 Dessau – 3 November 1616 Sønderborg), and they had the following children:
 Eleonore of Schleswig-Holstein-Sonderburg (4 April 1590 – 13 April 1669)
 Anna Sabine of Schleswig-Holstein-Sonderburg (7 March 1593 – 18 July 1659), married on 1 January 1618 to Julius Frederick, Duke of Württemberg-Weiltingen.
 Johann Georg of Schleswig-Holstein-Sonderburg (9 February 1594 – 25 January 1613)
 Joachim Ernest, Duke of Schleswig-Holstein-Sonderburg-Plön (29 August 1595 – 5 October 1671)
 Dorothea Sibylle of Schleswig-Holstein-Sonderburg (13 July 1597 – 21 August 1597)
 Dorothea Marie of Schleswig-Holstein-Sonderburg (23 July 1599 – 27 March 1600)
 Bernhard of Schleswig-Holstein-Sonderburg (12 April 1601 – 26 April 1601)
 Agnes Magdalene of Schleswig-Holstein-Sonderburg (17 November 1602 – 17 May 1607)
 Eleonore Sophie of Schleswig-Holstein-Sonderburg (24 February 1603 – 5 January 1675), married on 28 February 1624 to Christian II, Prince of Anhalt-Bernburg.

Ancestry

References

Citations

Bibliography

 

1545 births
1622 deaths
People from Haderslev Municipality
House of Oldenburg in Schleswig-Holstein
Danish princes
Norwegian princes
People from the Duchy of Schleswig
Children of Christian III of Denmark
Sons of kings